Sedum oaxacanum is a species of flowering plant in the family Crassulaceae. They are evergreen perennials reaching heights of 10 to 20 centimeters, with simple blue-green leaves and yellow five-stellate flowers.

Sedum oaxacanum is native to Mexico. Through vegetative cloning it is propagated from cuttings.

References

External links
 Rose, J. N. 1911. Contr. U.S. Natl. Herb. 13: 299.
 Encyclopedia of Life entry
 Hortipedia entry
 NCBI Sedum oaxacanum nucleotide

oaxacanum